The Toronto Jr. Aeros are a Junior women's ice hockey team based in Toronto, Ontario, Canada.  The Aeros are members of the Provincial Women's Hockey League of the Ontario Women's Hockey Association.  The Aeros are five-time PWHL regular season champions, six-time PWHL playoff champions, and four-time Ontario Intermediate AA champions.  On two occasions (2005 and 2006) the Aeros won all three titles in one season.

Tradition

The Senior Toronto Aeros were founded in 1974 and existed until the folding of the National Women's Hockey League in 2007 (which it joined in 1999).  The Aeros program raised up both of the two only Canadian female players in the Hockey Hall of Fame: Angela James and Geraldine Heaney.

The Toronto Jr. Aeros were founded in 1991 and entered the Provincial Women's Hockey League at its inception in 2004.  The Midget Aeros, affiliated with the Junior Aeros, were founded in 2001.  Currently, the Aeros only operate a Midget and Junior team.

History
The Junior Aeros entered the Provincial Women's Hockey League during its first season, 2004–05, and won its regular-season championship as well as the Alumni Cup as the league's playoff champion.  The Jr. Aeros also won the OWHA Intermediate AA Championship tournament to complete the triple crown.

The 2005–06 season saw the Aeros double the feat, if not better it, by finishing the regular season with an undefeated (27–0–3) record. The Aeros also did not lose a game during the league playoffs. Future Canadian Olympian Haley Irwin was a star on the team those first two seasons. Irwin was named team most valuable player each of those seasons before being picked up by the NCAA Division I Minnesota–Duluth Bulldogs.  Courtney Birchard was a member of the Jr. Aeros lineup during the first two seasons before jumping to the New Hampshire Wildcats of ECAC Hockey. Also, Christina Kessler starred in net for the Aeros during the 2005–06 season before jumping to the Harvard Crimson hockey team. During Kessler's season with the team, she and Jamie Miller combined for the lowest goals-against average in the PWHL.

Goalie Jamie Miller either led or co-led the PWHL in each of the league's first three seasons. Miller spent a season with the Division I Quinnipiac Bobcats and is now a member of the Canadian Women's Hockey League's Brampton Hockey Team. During the 2006–07 season, the Jr. Aeros won their third straight regular season championship and their third straight league playoff championship, but were upset in the preliminary round of the OWHA Provincials by the Aurora Jr. Panthers to deny them their third straight triple crown.

Season-by-season results

Professional and National Team alumni

Courtney Birchard
Celine Frappier
Haley Irwin
Christina Kessler
Jamie Miller
Jillian Saulnier
Sonja van der Bliek

References

External links
Jr. Aeros Website
PWHL Website

Provincial Women's Hockey League teams
Ice hockey teams in Toronto